Nannfeldtiella is a genus of fungi in the family Pyronemataceae.

The genus name of Nannfeldtiella is in honour of Johan Axel Frithiof Nannfeldt (1904-1985), who was a Swedish botanist and mycologist.

The genus was circumscribed by Finn-Egil Eckblad in Nytt Mag. Bot. vol.15 on page 116 in 1968.

The GBIF list this as a synonym of Pseudombrophila aggregata .

References

External links
Index Fungorum

Pyronemataceae
Pezizales genera